J. J. Denman (born  1994) is an American football offensive tackle. He currently attends Rutgers University. Denman is regarded as one of the best offensive tackles of his class.

A native of Yardley, Pennsylvania, Denman attended Pennsbury High School where he was an All-American offensive lineman. Regarded as a four-star recruit by Rivals.com, Denman was listed as the No. 27 offensive tackle prospect of his class. He committed to Rutgers after switching from Penn State to Wisconsin, following Joe Paterno's leave.

References

External links 
Rutgers Scarlet Knights bio

1994 births
Living people
People from Yardley, Pennsylvania
American football offensive tackles
Rutgers Scarlet Knights football players
Players of American football from Pennsylvania
Sportspeople from Bucks County, Pennsylvania